Aljezur International School is located a short distance from the town of Aljezur in the western Algarve, Portugal.
The school provides secondary education, taught in the English language, to children from 10 – 17 years of age following the Cambridge International syllabus and leading to Cambridge International IGCSE qualifications in a broad range of subjects.
Aljezur International School is an accredited Cambridge International Examinations Centre and, as the only open exam centre in the western Algarve, accommodates both internal and external students for IGCSE examinations.

Aljezur International officially opened as the area's first International school in September 2010.

The school houses several classrooms, library, art room, dining room and kitchen, and has access to laboratory facilities, sporting complex and multi-sport gymnasium.

The school serves the municipalities of Aljezur, Lagos, and Vila do Bispo.

References

External links

 Aljezur International School Official website

2010 establishments in Portugal
British international schools in Europe
Educational institutions established in 2010
International schools in Portugal
Cambridge schools in Portugal
Secondary schools in Portugal
Aljezur
Buildings and structures in Faro District